Leiothylax is a genus of flowering plants belonging to the family Podostemaceae.

Its native range is Cameroon to Tanzania and Angola.

Species:

Leiothylax callewaertii 
Leiothylax drummondii 
Leiothylax quangensis 
Leiothylax warmingii

References

Podostemaceae
Malpighiales genera